Le Bon Plaisir is a 1984 French film directed by Francis Girod. The film relates the story of the efforts of a President of the French Republic (Jean-Louis Trintignant) informed, after a number of years, of the existence of a son born from an extramarital relationship with Claire (Catherine Deneuve), a former mistress, to cover up any kind of proof likely to tarnish his reputation using the secret service.

Cast
 Catherine Deneuve as Claire Després
 Jean-Louis Trintignant as The President
 Michel Serrault as Minister of the Interior
 Hippolyte Girardot as Pierre
 Michel Auclair as Herbert
 Alexandra Stewart as Julie Hoffman
 Claude Winter as The First Lady
 Michel Boisrond as The First Minister

Discography

The CD soundtrack composed by Georges Delerue.

References

External links
 

1980 films
French drama films
1980s French-language films
Films scored by Georges Delerue
Films directed by Francis Girod
1980s French films